The Nature Park & Galleries (NPG; Hebrew: שדרות טבע וגלריות), is the “open-air campus museum” of the Hebrew University of Jerusalem, located on the University's Edmund J. Safra Science Campus in Jerusalem, Israel.

Overview
Established in 2003, NPG shares the University's knowledge and ideas with the public. NPG began by interpreting for visitors objects and activities already present on campus. Later it commenced, and continues, implementing major permanent displays, as at most museums, mostly out of doors. Initially visitors were led by trained student guides, whereas now visitors guide themselves, using several interpretive formats. Originally a fee was charged for scheduled tours, now the museum is free and open all hours every day. Published research by NPG focuses on novel ways of enhancing visitor experiences in different types of destinations. NPG is a unit of the university's Authority for Community and Youth and carries out its own fund raising.

History and operation
The Nature Park & Galleries opened to the public in August 2003. As originally conceived, it operated a set of guided programs on approximately ten (later fifteen) different subjects. Each program, lasting about one hour, took place on the Edmund J. Safra Science Campus of the Hebrew University. These programs included walking tours, sit-down demonstrations, behind-the-scenes visits and workshops, each for a fee. The guides, mostly graduate students, were trained in guiding by a masters-level university course. Underlying these developments lay the concept that the Edmund J. Safra Campus (and no doubt many other university campuses) already was a museum – or almost. Collections available for NPG's guided tours included the National Collections of Natural History, the National Library of Israel, the Albert Einstein Archive, the Magnes Press, forefront research laboratories, the campus architecture, trees and gardens. All that was needed for turning this into a museum was a means of interpreting these and other campus features – that is, to tell their "stories" – for the public. The student tour guides provided that interpretation.

Beginning in 2013, NPG changed its approach to interpretation. No longer are student-guided programs offered. Rather, an array of means for self-guiding was developed, including brochures, guide books, smart-phone audio-guides, and permanent signage. NPG is now open to all, for free, at any time. According to NPG's Founding Director, Professor Emeritus Jeff Camhi (Kimchi) of the university's Life Sciences Institute, the switch from student guides to a self guiding framework brings the NPG experience in line with the most common way people visit museums around the world. This switch also offers greater financial sustainability, and exposure to a wider visiting public.

NPG functions as a unit of the Hebrew University's Authority for Community and Youth, but carries out its own fund-raising.

Exhibits
NPG has implemented several permanent museum displays on the campus.
 
Plant Evolution Garden: In this garden, one walks through 500 million years of plant history. Signs explain the major turning points in plant evolution and direct the visitor's view toward features of the living plants that illustrate these turning points. Among the turning points featured are vegetation's initial movement from water to land, the later development of roots, leaves, and vertical growth, the first seed plants, early conifers and early flowering plants, and adaptations to moist, and to arid environments by modern plants.

 Bird Migration Trail: Fifty birds, sculpted in bronze, painted true to life, and permanently installed among the campus gardens, are the work of Israeli artist and bird fancier Roi Shinar. The fifty are divided into four separate displays, according to the season of their annual appearance on campus. The four are: Autumn arrivals from Europe and Asia; Spring arrivals from Africa; Autumn and spring stop-over birds in transit between Eurasia and Africa; Permanent resident birds. Explanatory signs give each bird's English, Hebrew and scientific name.
 Ecology Boardwalk:  The 8-acre forest in the heart of campus looks disorderly compared to the neatly planned campus gardens. But, as the signage soon to be installed along this 300 meter boardwalk explains, forests have their own order.
Discovery Tree Walk: NPG highlights 50 campus trees, originating from six continents. The stories told in the signs, guide book, and smart-phone audio-guide are partly botanical, partly historic, folkloric, biblical, commercial, and aesthetic. The signage is interactive – each sign tells the tree's “story”, asks a short question about the tree and provides its answer. 
Sequoia Slice: A slice, taken from the trunk of a fallen 2000-year-old Giant Sequoia tree from California, has been permanently installed on campus by NPG. It stands besides Israel's oldest living Sequoia tree. Among the features of this trunk slice are evidences of several fires during the past twenty centuries, and recovery by the trees's subsequent growth.
 Exhibit in Planning: NPG is currently developing a new permanent exhibit on the scientific research carried out on campus. Opening expected summer, 2015.

Publications
NPG publishes books interpreting the treasures of the Safra Campus:

Michael Avishai and Jeff Camhi, "Fifty Tree Tales: Edmond J. Safra Campus, Givat Ram Tree Guide" (Jerusalem: Nature Park & Galleries, 2007). 
Yoav Motro and Jeff Camhi, "Fifty Bird Tales: A Guide to the Walton Avenue Foundation Bird Migration Trail of the Edmond J. Safra Campus, Givat Ram" (Jerusalem: Nature Park & Galleries, in preparation).

NPG carries out research on how universities can enhance their outreach to the public, and how their guides can enhance visitor interest using new communicative skills:

Jeff Camhi, Dam in the River: Releasing the Flow of University Ideas (New York: Algora Publications, 2013). 
Jeff Camhi, “Pathways for communicating about objects on guided tours.” Curator: The Museum Journal 51(3): 2008, 277–296.
Dina Tsybulskaya and Jeff Camhi, “Accessing and incorporating visitors’ entrance narratives in guided museum tours.” Curator: The Museum Journal 52(1): 2009, 81–100.
Jeff Camhi, Dina Tsybulskaya and Jeff Dodick, "An ‘open campus museum’ for sharing science with the public.” International Journal of Science in Society 4(4): 2013, 101–108.

References

External links 
NPG official website

2003 establishments in Israel
Museums established in 2003
Museums in Jerusalem
University museums in Israel
Open-air museums
Botanical gardens in Israel
Hebrew University of Jerusalem
Outdoor structures in Israel